Edgar Allan Poe (Edgar Poe; January 19, 1809 – October 7, 1849) was an American writer, poet, editor, and literary critic who is best known for his poetry and short stories, particularly his tales of mystery and the macabre. He is widely regarded as a central figure of Romanticism in the United States, and of American literature. He was one of the country's earliest practitioners of the short story, and is considered the inventor of the detective fiction genre, as well as a significant contributor to the emerging genre of science fiction. He is the first well-known American writer to earn a living through writing alone, resulting in a financially difficult life and career.

Poe was born in Boston, the second child of actors David and Elizabeth "Eliza" Poe. His father abandoned the family in 1810, and when his mother died the following year, Poe was taken in by John and Frances Allan of Richmond, Virginia. They never formally adopted him, but he was with them well into young adulthood. He attended the University of Virginia but left after a year due to lack of money. He quarreled with John Allan over the funds for his education, and his gambling debts. In 1827, having enlisted in the United States Army under an assumed name, he published his first collection, Tamerlane and Other Poems, credited only to "a Bostonian". Poe and Allan reached a temporary rapprochement after the death of Allan's wife in 1829. Poe later failed as an officer cadet at West Point, declared a firm wish to be a poet and writer, and parted ways with Allan.

Poe switched his focus to prose, and spent the next several years working for literary journals and periodicals, becoming known for his own style of literary criticism. His work forced him to move among several cities, including Baltimore, Philadelphia, and New York City. In 1836, he married his 13-year-old cousin, Virginia Clemm, but she died of tuberculosis in 1847. In January 1845, he published his poem "The Raven" to instant success. He planned for years to produce his own journal The Penn (later renamed The Stylus), but before it could be produced, he died in Baltimore on October 7, 1849, aged 40, under mysterious circumstances. The cause of his death remains unknown, and has been variously attributed to many causes including disease, alcoholism, substance abuse, and suicide.

Poe and his works influenced literature around the world, as well as specialized fields such as cosmology and cryptography. He and his work appear throughout popular culture in literature, music, films, and television. A number of his homes are dedicated museums. The Mystery Writers of America present an annual Edgar Award for distinguished work in the mystery genre.

Early life

Edgar Poe was born in Boston, Massachusetts, on January 19, 1809, the second child of American actor David Poe Jr. and English-born actress Elizabeth Arnold Hopkins Poe. He had an elder brother, William, and a younger sister, Rosalie. Their grandfather, David Poe, had emigrated from County Cavan, Ireland, around 1750.  

His father abandoned the family in 1810, and his mother died a year later from consumption (pulmonary tuberculosis). Poe was then taken into the home of John Allan, a successful merchant in Richmond, Virginia, who dealt in a variety of goods, including cloth, wheat, tombstones, tobacco, and slaves. The Allans served as a foster family and gave him the name "Edgar Allan Poe", although they never formally adopted him.

The Allan family had Poe baptized into the Episcopal Church in 1812. John Allan alternately spoiled and aggressively disciplined his foster son. The family sailed to the United Kingdom in 1815, and Poe attended the grammar school for a short period in Irvine, Ayrshire, Scotland (where Allan was born) before rejoining the family in London in 1816. There he studied at a boarding school in Chelsea until summer 1817.

Poe moved with the Allans back to Richmond in 1820. In 1824, he served as the lieutenant of the Richmond youth honor guard as the city celebrated the visit of the Marquis de Lafayette. In March 1825, Allan's uncle and business benefactor William Galt died, who was said to be one of the wealthiest men in Richmond, leaving Allan several acres of real estate. The inheritance was estimated at $750,000. By summer 1825, Allan celebrated his expansive wealth by purchasing a two-story brick house called Moldavia.

Poe may have become engaged to Sarah Elmira Royster before he registered at the University of Virginia in February 1826 to study ancient and modern languages. The university was in its infancy, established on the ideals of its founder Thomas Jefferson. It had strict rules against gambling, horses, guns, tobacco, and alcohol, but these rules were mostly ignored. Jefferson enacted a system of student self-government, allowing students to choose their own studies, make their own arrangements for boarding, and report all wrongdoing to the faculty. The unique system was still in chaos, and there was a high dropout rate. During his time there, Poe lost touch with Royster and also became estranged from his foster father over gambling debts. He claimed that Allan had not given him sufficient money to register for classes, purchase texts, and procure and furnish a dormitory. Allan did send additional money and clothes, but Poe's debts increased. Poe gave up on the university after a year but did not feel welcome returning to Richmond, especially when he learned that his sweetheart Royster had married another man, Alexander Shelton. He traveled to Boston in April 1827, sustaining himself with odd jobs as a clerk and newspaper writer, and started using the pseudonym Henri Le Rennet during this period.

Military career

Poe was unable to support himself, so he enlisted in the United States Army as a private on May 27, 1827, using the name "Edgar A. Perry". He claimed that he was  even though he was 18. He first served at Fort Independence in Boston Harbor for five dollars a month. That year, he released his first book, a 40-page collection of poetry titled Tamerlane and Other Poems, attributed with the byline "by a Bostonian". Only 50 copies were printed, and the book received virtually no attention. Poe's regiment was posted to Fort Moultrie in Charleston, South Carolina, and traveled by ship on the brig Waltham on November 8, 1827. Poe was promoted to "artificer", an enlisted tradesman who prepared shells for artillery, and had his monthly pay doubled. He served for two years and attained the rank of Sergeant Major for Artillery (the highest rank that a non-commissioned officer could achieve); he then sought to end his five-year enlistment early. He revealed his real name and his circumstances to his commanding officer, Lieutenant Howard, who would allow Poe to be discharged only if he reconciled with Allan. Poe wrote a letter to Allan, who was unsympathetic and spent several months ignoring Poe's pleas; Allan may not have written to Poe even to make him aware of his foster mother's illness. Frances Allan died on February 28, 1829, and Poe visited the day after her burial. Perhaps softened by his wife's death, Allan agreed to support Poe's attempt to be discharged in order to receive an appointment to the United States Military Academy at West Point, New York.

Poe was finally discharged on April 15, 1829, after securing a replacement to finish his enlisted term for him. Before entering West Point, he moved to Baltimore for a time to stay with his widowed aunt Maria Clemm, her daughter Virginia Eliza Clemm (Poe's first cousin), his brother Henry, and his invalid grandmother Elizabeth Cairnes Poe. In September of that year, Poe received "the very first words of encouragement I ever remember to have heard" in a review of his poetry by influential critic John Neal, prompting Poe to dedicate one of the poems to Neal in his second book Al Aaraaf, Tamerlane and Minor Poems, published in Baltimore in 1829.

Poe traveled to West Point and matriculated as a cadet on July 1, 1830. In October 1830, Allan married his second wife Louisa Patterson. The marriage and bitter quarrels with Poe over the children born to Allan out of extramarital affairs led to the foster father finally disowning Poe. Poe decided to leave West Point by purposely getting court-martialed. On February 8, 1831, he was tried for gross neglect of duty and disobedience of orders for refusing to attend formations, classes, or church. He tactically pleaded not guilty to induce dismissal, knowing that he would be found guilty.

Poe left for New York in February 1831 and released a third volume of poems, simply titled Poems. The book was financed with help from his fellow cadets at West Point, many of whom donated 75 cents to the cause, raising a total of $170. They may have been expecting verses similar to the satirical ones Poe had written about commanding officers. It was printed by Elam Bliss of New York, labeled as "Second Edition", and including a page saying, "To the U.S. Corps of Cadets this volume is respectfully dedicated". The book once again reprinted the long poems "Tamerlane" and "Al Aaraaf" but also six previously unpublished poems, including early versions of "To Helen", "Israfel", and "The City in the Sea". Poe returned to Baltimore to his aunt, brother, and cousin in March 1831. His elder brother Henry had been in ill health, in part due to problems with alcoholism, and he died on August 1, 1831.

Publishing career
After his brother's death, Poe began more earnest attempts to start his career as a writer, but he chose a difficult time in American publishing to do so. He was one of the first Americans to live by writing alone and was hampered by the lack of an international copyright law. American publishers often produced unauthorized copies of British works rather than paying for new work by Americans. The industry was also particularly hurt by the Panic of 1837. There was a booming growth in American periodicals around this time, fueled in part by new technology, but many did not last beyond a few issues. Publishers often refused to pay their writers or paid them much later than they promised, and Poe repeatedly resorted to humiliating pleas for money and other assistance.

After his early attempts at poetry, Poe had turned his attention to prose, likely based on John Neal's critiques in The Yankee magazine. He placed a few stories with a Philadelphia publication and began work on his only drama Politian. The Baltimore Saturday Visiter awarded him a prize in October 1833 for his short story "MS. Found in a Bottle". The story brought him to the attention of John P. Kennedy, a Baltimorean of considerable means who helped Poe place some of his stories and introduced him to Thomas W. White, editor of the Southern Literary Messenger in Richmond. Poe became assistant editor of the periodical in August 1835, but White discharged him within a few weeks for being drunk on the job. Poe returned to Baltimore where he obtained a license to marry his cousin Virginia on September 22, 1835, though it is unknown if they were married at that time. He was 26 and she was 13.

Poe was reinstated by White after promising good behavior, and he went back to Richmond with Virginia and her mother. He remained at the Messenger until January 1837. During this period, Poe claimed that its circulation increased from 700 to 3,500. He published several poems, book reviews, critiques, and stories in the paper. On May 16, 1836, he and Virginia held a Presbyterian wedding ceremony performed by Amasa Converse at their Richmond boarding house, with a witness falsely attesting Clemm's age as 21.

Poe's novel The Narrative of Arthur Gordon Pym of Nantucket was published and widely reviewed in 1838. In the summer of 1839, he became assistant editor of Burton's Gentleman's Magazine. He published numerous articles, stories, and reviews, enhancing his reputation as a trenchant critic which he had established at the Messenger. Also in 1839, the collection Tales of the Grotesque and Arabesque was published in two volumes, though he made little money from it and it received mixed reviews.

In June 1840, Poe published a prospectus announcing his intentions to start his own journal called The Stylus, although he originally intended to call it The Penn, as it would have been based in Philadelphia. He bought advertising space for his prospectus in the June 6, 1840, issue of Philadelphia's Saturday Evening Post: "Prospectus of the Penn Magazine, a Monthly Literary journal to be edited and published in the city of Philadelphia by Edgar A. Poe." The journal was never produced before Poe's death.

Poe left Burton's after about a year and found a position as writer and co-editor at the then-very-successful monthly Graham's Magazine. In the last number of Graham's for 1841, Poe was among the co-signatories to an editorial note of celebration of the tremendous success the magazine had achieved in the past year: "Perhaps the editors of no magazine, either in America or in Europe, ever sat down, at the close of a year, to contemplate the progress of their work with more satisfaction than we do now. Our success has been unexampled, almost incredible. We may assert without fear of contradiction that no periodical ever witnessed the same increase during so short a period."

Around this time, Poe attempted to secure a position within the administration of President John Tyler, claiming that he was a member of the Whig Party. He hoped to be appointed to the United States Custom House in Philadelphia with help from President Tyler's son Robert, an acquaintance of Poe's friend Frederick Thomas. Poe failed to show up for a meeting with Thomas to discuss the appointment in mid-September 1842, claiming to have been sick, though Thomas believed that he had been drunk. Poe was promised an appointment, but all positions were filled by others.

One evening in January 1842, Virginia showed the first signs of consumption, or tuberculosis, while singing and playing the piano, which Poe described as breaking a blood vessel in her throat. She only partially recovered, and Poe began to drink more heavily under the stress of her illness. He left Graham's and attempted to find a new position, for a time angling for a government post. He returned to New York where he worked briefly at the Evening Mirror before becoming editor of the Broadway Journal, and later its owner. There Poe alienated himself from other writers by publicly accusing Henry Wadsworth Longfellow of plagiarism, though Longfellow never responded. On January 29, 1845, Poe's poem "The Raven" appeared in the Evening Mirror and became a popular sensation. It made Poe a household name almost instantly, though he was paid only $9 for its publication. It was concurrently published in The American Review: A Whig Journal under the pseudonym "Quarles".

The Broadway Journal failed in 1846, and Poe moved to a cottage in Fordham, New York, in the Bronx. That home, now known as the Edgar Allan Poe Cottage, was relocated in later years to a park near the southeast corner of the Grand Concourse and Kingsbridge Road. Nearby, Poe befriended the Jesuits at St. John's College, now Fordham University. Virginia died at the cottage on January 30, 1847. Biographers and critics often suggest that Poe's frequent theme of the "death of a beautiful woman" stems from the repeated loss of women throughout his life, including his wife.

Poe was increasingly unstable after his wife's death. He attempted to court poet Sarah Helen Whitman, who lived in Providence, Rhode Island. Their engagement failed, purportedly because of Poe's drinking and erratic behavior. There is also strong evidence that Whitman's mother intervened and did much to derail their relationship. Poe then returned to Richmond and resumed a relationship with his childhood sweetheart Sarah Elmira Royster.

Death

On October 3, 1849, Poe was found semiconscious in Baltimore, "in great distress, and... in need of immediate assistance", according to Joseph W. Walker, who found him. He was taken to the Washington Medical College, where he died on Sunday, October 7, 1849, at 5:00 in the morning. Poe was not coherent long enough to explain how he came to be in his dire condition and why he was wearing clothes that were not his own. He is said to have repeatedly called out the name "Reynolds" on the night before his death, though it is unclear to whom he was referring. His attending physician said that Poe's final words were, "Lord help my poor soul". All of the relevant medical records have been lost, including Poe's death certificate.

Newspapers at the time reported Poe's death as "congestion of the brain" or "cerebral inflammation", common euphemisms for death from disreputable causes such as alcoholism. The actual cause of death remains a mystery. Speculation has included delirium tremens, heart disease, epilepsy, syphilis, meningeal inflammation, cholera, carbon monoxide poisoning, and rabies. One theory dating from 1872 suggests that Poe's death resulted from cooping, a form of electoral fraud in which citizens were forced to vote for a particular candidate, sometimes leading to violence and even murder.

Griswold's "Memoir"
Immediately after Poe's death, his literary rival Rufus Wilmot Griswold wrote a slanted high-profile obituary under a pseudonym, filled with falsehoods that cast Poe as a lunatic, and which described him as a person who "walked the streets, in madness or melancholy, with lips moving in indistinct curses, or with eyes upturned in passionate prayers, (never for himself, for he felt, or professed to feel, that he was already damned)".

The long obituary appeared in the New York Tribune signed "Ludwig" on the day that Poe was buried. It was soon further published throughout the country. The piece began, "Edgar Allan Poe is dead. He died in Baltimore the day before yesterday. This announcement will startle many, but few will be grieved by it." "Ludwig" was soon identified as Griswold, an editor, critic, and anthologist who had borne a grudge against Poe since 1842. Griswold somehow became Poe's literary executor and attempted to destroy his enemy's reputation after his death.

Griswold wrote a biographical article of Poe called "Memoir of the Author", which he included in an 1850 volume of the collected works. There he depicted Poe as a depraved, drunken, drug-addled madman and included Poe's letters as evidence. Many of his claims were either lies or distortions; for example, it is seriously disputed that Poe was a drug addict. Griswold's book was denounced by those who knew Poe well, including John Neal, who published an article defending Poe and attacking Griswold as a "Rhadamanthus, who is not to be bilked of his fee, a thimble-full of newspaper notoriety". Griswold's book nevertheless became a popularly accepted biographical source. This was in part because it was the only full biography available and was widely reprinted, and in part because readers thrilled at the thought of reading works by an "evil" man. Letters that Griswold presented as proof were later revealed as forgeries.

Literary style and themes

Genres
Poe's best-known fiction works are Gothic horror, adhering to the genre's conventions to appeal to the public taste. His most recurring themes deal with questions of death, including its physical signs, the effects of decomposition, concerns of premature burial, the reanimation of the dead, and mourning. Many of his works are generally considered part of the dark romanticism genre, a literary reaction to transcendentalism which Poe strongly disliked. He referred to followers of the transcendental movement as "Frog-Pondians", after the pond on Boston Common, and ridiculed their writings as "metaphor—run mad," lapsing into "obscurity for obscurity's sake" or "mysticism for mysticism's sake". Poe once wrote in a letter to Thomas Holley Chivers that he did not dislike transcendentalists, "only the pretenders and sophists among them".

Beyond horror, Poe also wrote satires, humor tales, and hoaxes. For comic effect, he used irony and ludicrous extravagance, often in an attempt to liberate the reader from cultural conformity. "Metzengerstein" is the first story that Poe is known to have published and his first foray into horror, but it was originally intended as a burlesque satirizing the popular genre. Poe also reinvented science fiction, responding in his writing to emerging technologies such as hot air balloons in "The Balloon-Hoax".

Poe wrote much of his work using themes aimed specifically at mass-market tastes. To that end, his fiction often included elements of popular pseudosciences, such as phrenology and physiognomy.

Literary theory
Poe's writing reflects his literary theories, which he presented in his criticism and also in essays such as "The Poetic Principle". He disliked didacticism and allegory, though he believed that meaning in literature should be an undercurrent just beneath the surface. Works with obvious meanings, he wrote, cease to be art. He believed that work of quality should be brief and focus on a specific single effect. To that end, he believed that the writer should carefully calculate every sentiment and idea.

Poe describes his method in writing "The Raven" in the essay "The Philosophy of Composition", and he claims to have strictly followed this method. It has been questioned whether he really followed this system, however. T. S. Eliot said: "It is difficult for us to read that essay without reflecting that if Poe plotted out his poem with such calculation, he might have taken a little more pains over it: the result hardly does credit to the method." Biographer Joseph Wood Krutch described the essay as "a rather highly ingenious exercise in the art of rationalization".

Legacy

Influence
During his lifetime, Poe was mostly recognized as a literary critic. Fellow critic James Russell Lowell called him "the most discriminating, philosophical, and fearless critic upon imaginative works who has written in America", suggesting—rhetorically—that he occasionally used prussic acid instead of ink. Poe's caustic reviews earned him the reputation of being a "tomahawk man". A favorite target of Poe's criticism was Boston's acclaimed poet Henry Wadsworth Longfellow, who was often defended by his literary friends in what was later called "The Longfellow War". Poe accused Longfellow of "the heresy of the didactic", writing poetry that was preachy, derivative, and thematically plagiarized. Poe correctly predicted that Longfellow's reputation and style of poetry would decline, concluding, "We grant him high qualities, but deny him the Future".

Poe was also known as a writer of fiction and became one of the first American authors of the 19th century to become more popular in Europe than in the United States. Poe is particularly respected in France, in part due to early translations by Charles Baudelaire. Baudelaire's translations became definitive renditions of Poe's work in Continental Europe.

Poe's early detective fiction tales featuring C. Auguste Dupin laid the groundwork for future detectives in literature. Sir Arthur Conan Doyle said, "Each [of Poe's detective stories] is a root from which a whole literature has developed.... Where was the detective story until Poe breathed the breath of life into it?" The Mystery Writers of America have named their awards for excellence in the genre the "Edgars". Poe's work also influenced science fiction, notably Jules Verne, who wrote a sequel to Poe's novel The Narrative of Arthur Gordon Pym of Nantucket called An Antarctic Mystery, also known as The Sphinx of the Ice Fields. Science fiction author H. G. Wells noted, "Pym tells what a very intelligent mind could imagine about the south polar region a century ago". In 2013, The Guardian cited Pym as one of the greatest novels ever written in the English language, and noted its influence on later authors such as Doyle, Henry James, B. Traven, and David Morrell.

Horror author and historian H. P. Lovecraft was heavily influenced by Poe's horror tales, dedicating an entire section of his long essay, "Supernatural Horror in Literature", to his influence on the genre. In his letters, Lovecraft described Poe as his "God of Fiction". Lovecraft's earlier stories express a significant influence from Poe. A later work, At the Mountains of Madness, quotes him and was influenced by The Narrative of Arthur Gordon Pym of Nantucket. Lovecraft also made extensive use of Poe's unity of effect in his fiction. Alfred Hitchcock once said, "It's because I liked Edgar Allan Poe's stories so much that I began to make suspense films". Many references to Poe's works are present in Vladimir Nabokov's novels.

Like many famous artists, Poe's works have spawned imitators. One trend among imitators of Poe has been claims by clairvoyants or psychics to be "channeling" poems from Poe's spirit. One of the most notable of these was Lizzie Doten, who published Poems from the Inner Life in 1863, in which she claimed to have "received" new compositions by Poe's spirit. The compositions were re-workings of famous Poe poems such as "The Bells", but which reflected a new, positive outlook.

Even so, Poe has also received criticism. This is partly because of the negative perception of his personal character and its influence upon his reputation. William Butler Yeats was occasionally critical of Poe and once called him "vulgar". Transcendentalist Ralph Waldo Emerson reacted to "The Raven" by saying, "I see nothing in it", and derisively referred to Poe as "the jingle man". Aldous Huxley wrote that Poe's writing "falls into vulgarity" by being "too poetical"—the equivalent of wearing a diamond ring on every finger.

It is believed that only twelve copies have survived of Poe's first book Tamerlane and Other Poems. In December 2009, one copy sold at Christie's auctioneers in New York City for $662,500, a record price paid for a work of American literature.

Physics and cosmology
Eureka: A Prose Poem, an essay written in 1848, included a cosmological theory that presaged the Big Bang theory by 80 years, as well as the first plausible solution to Olbers' paradox.
Poe eschewed the scientific method in Eureka and instead wrote from pure intuition. For this reason, he considered it a work of art, not science, but insisted that it was still true and considered it to be his career masterpiece. Even so, Eureka is full of scientific errors. In particular, Poe's suggestions ignored Newtonian principles regarding the density and rotation of planets.

Cryptography
Poe had a keen interest in cryptography. He had placed a notice of his abilities in the Philadelphia paper Alexander's Weekly (Express) Messenger, inviting submissions of ciphers which he proceeded to solve. In July 1841, Poe had published an essay called "A Few Words on Secret Writing" in Graham's Magazine. Capitalizing on public interest in the topic, he wrote "The Gold-Bug" incorporating ciphers as an essential part of the story. Poe's success with cryptography relied not so much on his deep knowledge of that field (his method was limited to the simple substitution cryptogram) as on his knowledge of the magazine and newspaper culture. His keen analytical abilities, which were so evident in his detective stories, allowed him to see that the general public was largely ignorant of the methods by which a simple substitution cryptogram can be solved, and he used this to his advantage. The sensation that Poe created with his cryptography stunts played a major role in popularizing cryptograms in newspapers and magazines.

Two ciphers he published in 1841 under the name "W. B. Tyler" were not solved until 1992 and 2000 respectively. One was a quote from Joseph Addison's play Cato; the other is probably based on a poem by Hester Thrale.

Poe had an influence on cryptography beyond increasing public interest during his lifetime. William Friedman, America's foremost cryptologist, was heavily influenced by Poe. Friedman's initial interest in cryptography came from reading "The Gold-Bug" as a child, an interest that he later put to use in deciphering Japan's PURPLE code during World War II.

In popular culture

As a character

The historical Edgar Allan Poe has appeared as a fictionalized character, often in order to represent the "mad genius" or "tormented artist" and in order to exploit his personal struggles. Many such depictions also blend in with characters from his stories, suggesting that Poe and his characters share identities. Often, fictional depictions of Poe use his mystery-solving skills in such novels as The Poe Shadow by Matthew Pearl.

Preserved homes, landmarks, and museums

No childhood home of Poe is still standing, including the Allan family's Moldavia estate. The oldest standing home in Richmond, the Old Stone House, is in use as the Edgar Allan Poe Museum, though Poe never lived there. The collection includes many items that Poe used during his time with the Allan family, and also features several rare first printings of Poe works. 13 West Range is the dorm room that Poe is believed to have used while studying at the University of Virginia in 1826; it is preserved and available for visits. Its upkeep is overseen by a group of students and staff known as the Raven Society.

The earliest surviving home in which Poe lived is in Baltimore, preserved as the Edgar Allan Poe House and Museum. Poe is believed to have lived in the home at the age of 23 when he first lived with Maria Clemm and Virginia (as well as his grandmother and possibly his brother William Henry Leonard Poe). It is open to the public and is also the home of the Edgar Allan Poe Society. Of the several homes that Poe, his wife Virginia, and his mother-in-law Maria rented in Philadelphia, only the last house has survived. The Spring Garden home, where the author lived in 1843–1844, is today preserved by the National Park Service as the Edgar Allan Poe National Historic Site. Poe's final home is preserved as the Edgar Allan Poe Cottage in the Bronx.

In Boston, a commemorative plaque on Boylston Street is several blocks away from the actual location of Poe's birth. The house which was his birthplace at 62 Carver Street no longer exists; also, the street has since been renamed "Charles Street South". A "square" at the intersection of Broadway, Fayette, and Carver Streets had once been named in his honor, but it disappeared when the streets were rearranged. In 2009, the intersection of Charles and Boylston Streets (two blocks north of his birthplace) was designated "Edgar Allan Poe Square".

In March 2014, fundraising was completed for construction of a permanent memorial sculpture, known as Poe Returning to Boston, at this location. The winning design by Stefanie Rocknak depicts a life-sized Poe striding against the wind, accompanied by a flying raven; his suitcase lid has fallen open, leaving a "paper trail" of literary works embedded in the sidewalk behind him. The public unveiling on October 5, 2014, was attended by former U.S. poet laureate Robert Pinsky.

Other Poe landmarks include a building on the Upper West Side where Poe temporarily lived when he first moved to New York. A plaque suggests that Poe wrote "The Raven" here. On Sullivan's Island in Charleston, South Carolina, the setting of Poe's tale "The Gold-Bug" and where Poe served in the Army in 1827 at Fort Moultrie, there is a restaurant called Poe's Tavern. In Fell's Point, Baltimore, a bar still stands where legend says that Poe was last seen drinking before his death. Known as "The Horse You Came in On", local lore insists that a ghost whom they call "Edgar" haunts the rooms above.

Photographs

Early daguerreotypes of Poe continue to arouse great interest among literary historians. Notable among them are:
 "Ultima Thule" ("far discovery") to honor the new photographic technique; taken in November 1848 in Providence, Rhode Island, probably by Edwin H. Manchester
 "Annie", given to Poe's friend Annie L. Richmond; probably taken in June 1849 in Lowell, Massachusetts, photographer unknown

Poe Toaster

Between 1949 and 2009, a bottle of cognac and three roses were left at Poe's original grave marker every January 19 by an unknown visitor affectionately referred to as the "Poe Toaster". Sam Porpora was a historian at the Westminster Church in Baltimore where Poe is buried; he claimed on August 15, 2007, that he had started the tradition in 1949. Porpora said that the tradition began in order to raise money and enhance the profile of the church. His story has not been confirmed, and some details which he gave to the press are factually inaccurate. The Poe Toaster's last appearance was on January 19, 2009, the day of Poe's bicentennial.

List of selected works

Short stories

 "The Black Cat"
 "The Cask of Amontillado"
 "A Descent into the Maelström"
 "The Facts in the Case of M. Valdemar"
 "The Fall of the House of Usher"
 "The Gold-Bug"
 "Hop-Frog"
 "The Imp of the Perverse"
 "Ligeia"
 "The Masque of the Red Death"
 "Morella"
 "The Murders in the Rue Morgue"
 "Never Bet the Devil Your Head"
 "The Oval Portrait"
 "The Pit and the Pendulum"
 "The Premature Burial"
 "The Purloined Letter"
 "The System of Doctor Tarr and Professor Fether"
 "The Tell-Tale Heart"
 "Loss of Breath"

Poetry

 "Al Aaraaf"
 "Annabel Lee"
 "The Bells"
 "The City in the Sea"
 "The Conqueror Worm"
 "A Dream Within a Dream"
 "Eldorado"
 "Eulalie"
 "The Haunted Palace"
 "To Helen"
 "Lenore"
 "Tamerlane"
 "The Raven"
 "Ulalume"

Other works
 Politian (1835) – Poe's only play
 The Narrative of Arthur Gordon Pym of Nantucket (1838) – Poe's only complete novel
 The Journal of Julius Rodman (1840) – Poe's second, unfinished novel
 "The Balloon-Hoax" (1844) – A journalistic hoax printed as a true story
 "The Philosophy of Composition" (1846) – Essay
 Eureka: A Prose Poem (1848) – Essay
 "The Poetic Principle" (1848) – Essay
 "The Light-House" (1849) – Poe's last, incomplete work

See also

 Edgar Allan Poe and music
 Edgar Allan Poe in television and film
 Edgar Allan Poe in popular culture
 List of coupled cousins
 USS E.A. Poe (IX-103)

References

Citations

Sources

 
 
  Based on 
 
 
 
 
 
 
 
 
 
 
 
 
 
 
 
 
 
 
 
 
 
 . Harrowitz discusses Poe's "tales of ratiocination" in the light of Charles Sanders Peirce's logic of making good guesses or abductive reasoning.
 
 
 
 
 
 
 
 
 
 
 
 
 
 
 
 
 
 
 
 
 
 
 
 
 
 * 
 
 
  (Originally published in 1941 by New York: Appleton-Century-Crofts, Inc.)
 
 
 
 
 
 
 
 
 
 
 
 
  (1968 edition printed by Rutgers University Press)

Further reading

 
 
 
 
 
 
 Robinson, Marilynne, "On Edgar Allan Poe", The New York Review of Books, vol. LXII, no. 2 (February 5, 2015), pp. 4, 6.

External links

 
 
 
 
 
 Edgar Allan Poe National Historic Site
 Edgar Allan Poe Society in Baltimore
 Poe Museum in Richmond, Virginia
 Edgar Allan Poe's Personal Correspondence  Shapell Manuscript Foundation
 Edgar Allan Poe's Collection  at the Harry Ransom Center at The University of Texas at Austin
 'Funeral' honours Edgar Allan Poe BBC News (with video) 2009-10-11
 Selected Stories from American Studies at the University of Virginia
 
 
 Finding aid to Edgar Allan Poe papers at Columbia University. Rare Book & Manuscript Library.

 
1809 births
1849 deaths
19th-century American dramatists and playwrights
19th-century American essayists
19th-century American male writers
19th-century American non-fiction writers
19th-century American novelists
19th-century American poets
19th-century American short story writers
19th-century pseudonymous writers
American crime writers
American detective fiction writers
American fantasy writers
American horror writers
American literary critics
American male dramatists and playwrights
American male essayists
American male non-fiction writers
American male novelists
American male poets
American male short story writers
American mystery writers
American people of English descent
American people of Irish descent
American science fiction writers
American social commentators
American speculative fiction writers
Burials at Westminster Hall and Burying Ground
Epic poets
Ghost story writers
Hall of Fame for Great Americans inductees
Literary theorists
Novelists from Maryland
Novelists from Massachusetts
Novelists from New York (state)
Novelists from Pennsylvania
Novelists from Virginia
People from the Bronx
Philosophical cosmologists
Poe family (United States)
Pre-computer cryptographers
Recreational cryptographers
Romantic poets
Surrealist writers
United States Army soldiers
United States Military Academy alumni
University of Virginia alumni
Unsolved deaths in the United States
Weird fiction writers
Writers of American Southern literature
Writers of Gothic fiction
Writers from Baltimore
Writers from Boston
Writers from Philadelphia
Writers from Richmond, Virginia